The pale-shouldered cicadabird or Sumba cicadabird (Edolisoma dohertyi) is a species of bird in the family Campephagidae. It is endemic to the Lesser Sunda Islands of Indonesia. Its natural habitats are subtropical or tropical moist lowland forest and subtropical or tropical moist montane forest.

References

pale-shouldered cicadabird
Birds of the Lesser Sunda Islands
Flores Island (Indonesia)
pale-shouldered cicadabird
Taxonomy articles created by Polbot